The Scania-Vabis 335/345/355 was a series of heavy duty trucks produced by Swedish automaker Scania-Vabis between 1931 and 1944.

Scania-Vabis 335 
In 1931 Scania-Vabis presented a larger version of its standard truck, called the 335. The truck had a payload capacity of 4 to 5 tonnes and was sold with a six-cylinder engine in petrol or Hesselman version. In 1936 the truck was modernized with a more streamlined front with a slightly sloping radiator cover. More importantly the engine and cab was moved forward so that the engine was mounted above the front axle. This meant increased payload capacity with a longer loading platform and a better distribution of axle loads. From 1936 onwards the truck was offered with Scania-Vabis’ first pre-chamber diesel engine.

Sales to private customers ceased at the outbreak of the Second World War. All production went instead to the Swedish Armed Forces and other public institutions. Most engines were converted to run on wood gas. The low energy content of wood gas led to plummeting engine power and the largest trucks were fitted with Scania-Vabis’ powerful eight-cylinder module engine.

Scania-Vabis 345 

In 1932 Scania-Vabis introduced its first forward control truck, the 345. Scania-Vabis referred to forward control trucks as "Bulldogs". The truck was first sold with a four-cylinder engine, but soon six-cylinder engines were added. In the first version, called a "false Bulldog", the engine was still located behind the front axle and the driver sat beside the engine. This was replaced in 1934 with a "genuine" forward control version, where the engine and the driver sat above the front axle.

Production of the 345 model stopped at the outbreak of the war. The Bulldog model had never been a market hit and it would take another twenty-five years before Scania-Vabis unveiled a new forward control truck, the LB76.

Scania-Vabis 355 
Scania-Vabis’ first long hauler, the 355, was presented in 1933 This model had an extra trailing axle in front of the driven third axle. The truck had a payload capacity of 6 to 7 tonnes and were built in both conventional and forward control version. The 355 disappeared again in 1936 and was replaced by larger versions of the 335.

Engines

References

External links 
 Scania Group - history
 Swedish brass cars - picture gallery

335
Vehicles introduced in 1931